Shamil Saidbegovich Asildarov (born 18 May 1983) is a Russian former footballer of Avar ethnicity.

Club career
Makhachkala-born Asildarov, is a journeyman striker who has played for eight different clubs in the last nine years.

On 2 July 2014, Asildarov signed a two-year contract with Anzhi Makhachkala. Leaving Anzhi after one season in June 2015.

In February 2016, Asildarov went on trial with Kazakhstan Premier League side FC Shakhter Karagandy.

On 13 June 2016, Asildarov signed a six-month contract with FC Tobol of the Kazakhstan Premier League.

On 16 February 2017, Asildarov returned to Anzhi for a third stint with the club. 
On 19 September 2020, Asildarov returned to Anzhi for a fourth stint on a contract until the end of the 2020–21 season.

After football
On 9 January 2020, Anzhi Makhachkala announced Asildarov as their new Vice President.

Achievements
 Russian Premier League bronze: 2006
 Russian Second Division Zone South top scorer: 2003 (31 goals)

External links
 Player page on the official Luch-Energiya website

References

Russian footballers
Living people
1983 births
FC Kuban Krasnodar players
FC Khimki players
FC Lokomotiv Moscow players
FC Akhmat Grozny players
FC Anzhi Makhachkala players
FC Luch Vladivostok players
PFC Spartak Nalchik players
FC Volga Nizhny Novgorod players
FC Volgar Astrakhan players
FC Tobol players
Russian Premier League players
Kazakhstan Premier League players
Russian expatriate footballers
Expatriate footballers in Kazakhstan
Russian people of Dagestani descent
Footballers from Makhachkala
Association football forwards
Avar people
FC Dynamo Makhachkala players